The 2012–13 FC Girondins de Bordeaux season was the 39th season since the club was refounded. The season was largely successful with the taking an unbeaten run from the previous season to 17 games which was ended on 4 October 2012 with a 3-0 defeat to Newcastle United in the Europa League, as well as winning the Coupe de France.

Review and events

Competitions

Ligue 1

League table

Results summary

Results by round

Matches

Coupe de France

Coupe de la Ligue

UEFA Europa League

Play-off round

Group stage

Round of 32

Round of 16

Sources

Match reports

Other sources

Bordeaux
Bordeaux
FC Girondins de Bordeaux seasons